Amychus manawatawhi, commonly known as the Three Kings click beetle, is a large flightless click beetle in the family Elateridae, found only on the Three Kings Islands of New Zealand.

Discovery and etymology 
This species was named and described by John Marris and Paul J. Johnson in 2010, based on a type specimen collected in 2006 at Lighthouse Bush on Great Island, Three Kings; the holotype was deposited in the Lincoln University Entomology Research Collection (LUNZ).

The name manawatawhi is taken from the Māori name for Great Island, Manawa Tawhi, which translates as "panting breath", referring to the feat of Te Aopuri chief Rauru swimming to the island from the mainland.

Description
Adult A. manawatawhi can be distinguished from other Amychus species by its lack of small nodules on the back, especially on the head and elytra, compared to A. granulatus and A. candezei. It is the largest of the three Amychus species, ranging from 16 to 24 mm. It has a flattened body shape and small vestigial wings. Click beetles are named for their ability to make an audible click when on their back to jump into the air. However, Amychus do not have the ability to defend themselves in this way.

Gallery

Distribution 

This species has only been collected from Great Island and South West Island in the Three Kings group. These islands have been isolated from the New Zealand mainland since the late Miocene, and have numerous endemic species; it seems likely that A. manawatawhi evolved on the Three Kings and has always been restricted to those islands.

Ecology 
The adult beetle has been collected at night from logs and the trunks of tree species such as Cordyline kaspar, Kunzea sinclairii and Meryta sinclairii, and by day from pitfall traps, litter samples, and under logs and rocks. Only a single larva has been collected, from South West Island.

Conservation 
A. manawatawhi has been classified as "Naturally Uncommon" by the Department of Conservation. Goats were introduced to Great Island in 1889, but removed in 1946.

References 

Beetles described in 2010
Endemic fauna of New Zealand
Beetles of New Zealand
Elateridae
Endemic insects of New Zealand